Hundadagar ('Dog-Days') is a 2015 novel by Einar Már Guðmundsson, published in Reykjavík by Mál og menning. It won the 2015 Íslensku bókmenntaverðlaunin in the literature category. It is set between the 1720s and the 1820s and prominently features the English collector of (inter alia) Icelandic manuscripts Joseph Banks.

Translations

 Hundedage, trans. by Erik Skyum-Nielsen (København: Lindhardt og Ringhof, 2015),  [2nd edn 2016, ; 9788711485828]

References

2015 novels
Icelandic novels
Novels set in Iceland
Novels set in the 18th century
Novels set in the 19th century
Icelandic-language novels
Mál og menning books